Douglas–Charles Airport , formerly known as Melville Hall Airport, is an airport located on the northeast coast of Dominica,  northwest of Marigot. It is about one hour away from the second largest city Portsmouth. It is one of only two airports in the island nation of Dominica, the other being Canefield Airport located three miles (5 km) northeast of Roseau.

History
The Melville Hall area was chosen as the site for Dominica's main airport in 1944, for it was the only place on the island with extensive flat land. It was only after the completion of the Cross-Country Roadway connection from Belles to Marigot, in 1958, that work on the airport began. The facility opened on 22 November 1961, and was first served by Douglas DC-3 Dakotas operated by BWIA.

Three airlines were operating scheduled passenger service with turboprop aircraft into the airport in late 1979 including Leeward Islands Air Transport (LIAT) with Hawker Siddeley HS 748 flights nonstop from Antigua, Fort de France, Pointe a Pitre and St. Lucia as well as direct, no change of plane HS 748 flights from Barbados, Grenada, Port of Spain and St. Vincent; Air Martinique with nonstop Fokker F27 service from Fort de France; and Air Guadeloupe with nonstop de Havilland Canada DHC-6 Twin Otter service from Pointe a Pitre.

Historical jetliner service

According to the Official Airline Guide (OAG), two airlines were operating scheduled passenger jet service into the Melville Hall Airport in the spring of 1995:  Carib Express with nonstop British Aerospace BAe 146-100 jet flights from Barbados, St. Kitts and St. Lucia; and Liberty Airlines with nonstop Boeing 727-200 jet service to St. Kitts and St. Lucia as well as direct, one stop 727 service to Fort Lauderdale.  The OAG also lists scheduled passenger service at this same time flown by LIAT into the airport with de Havilland Canada DHC-8 Dash 8 turboprops nonstop from Antigua, Fort de France, Pointe a Pitre, and St. Maarten as well as direct, no change of plane Dash 8 flights from Anguilla, Port of Spain, St. Lucia, San Juan, PR and Tortola.

Airport expansion

In 2006 an airport expansion and upgrade program began which entailed the expansion of the terminal building to include a new departure lounge, customs and immigration section, and check-in area. The runway and apron were also extended and new night landing and navigational aids were installed. These enhancements had an extended completion date of mid-2010.

The first-ever night landing was conducted on 9 August 2010 by Winair. Regular night landings at the airport began on 20 September 2010; the first flight, from LIAT, flew from V.C. Bird International Airport in Antigua.

Renaming of airport

The airport was renamed from Melville Hall Airport to Douglas–Charles Airport on 27 October 2014 in honour of Prime Ministers Rosie Douglas and Pierre Charles.

Commercial jetliner service

On July 22, 2021, American Airlines announced a new, twice-weekly nonstop jet service between Miami and Dominica, which began on December 8, 2021. The service is operated by its American Eagle affiliate Embraer 175. This marked the first non-stop commercial service between the mainland United States and Dominica. The initial service operated twice weekly until 10 January 2022, when it increased to thrice weekly. As of April 5, 2022, flights now operate once daily. American Eagle is currently the largest airline at the airport. As of August 16, 2022, the government is in reported talks with American Airlines to increase frequencies to the airport with an extra daily service (Weekends, Mondays, and Wednesdays) from Miami.

American Eagle is now the largest air carrier to serve the airport, with a 36% market share.

Air Century operates chartered services with the CRJ 200 from San Juan and Santo Domingo–La Isabela.
Fly All Ways operates chartered services with the Fokker 70 to Curaçao and Paramaribo.
InterCaribbean Airways operates chartered services with the Embraer 145 to various destinations in the Caribbean region.
Sunrise Airways operates chartered services with the Embraer 145 to Port-au-Prince, and Santo Domingo–La Isabela.

Government of Dominica in talks with other airlines

Many sources have stated that the government of Dominica is in talks with various airlines - including Air Canada, Delta Air Lines, JetBlue, and United Airlines - for new service options to Canada, and the northeastern United States.

Notable airliner visits

On April 4, 2020, an Avianca Airbus A320neo arrived at the airport with medical supplies and equipment from Paramaribo. 
After offloading the cargo, the aircraft left shortly after for Bogota. The aircraft was the largest Airliner to ever land at the airport.

The airport has also handled other airliners and cargo aircraft of similar sizes in the past.

A Canadian North Boeing 737-500, which operated as a charter for a soccer team.

On Monday, October 14, 2013, a McDonnell Douglas MD-80 operated by Danish Air Transport in collaboration with Coca Cola arrived on the island, carrying the FIFA World Cup Trophy.

On Saturday, November 2, 2019, a United States Air Force Boeing C-17 Globemaster III arrived with cargo and other humanitarian equipment.

Amerijet was once a frequent operator at the airport with its Boeing 727-200F, until the airline retired the type in 2018.

Upcoming new airlines

Based on a recent report as of August 16, 2022, Venezuelan-based charter airline Sasca (in cooperation with Barbados' Executive Air and Blue Star), will soon begin operating flights in the Eastern Caribbean between Dominica and Barbados, Grenada, St.Lucia, and St. Vincent and the Grenadines. The flights will be operated by Jetstream 31 and Jetstream 32 aircraft.

Facilities

Passenger terminal

The Passenger Terminal at the airport houses 10 airline check-in counters, the arrivals and departures area, and 2 Gates. Recently, there was an addition made to the terminal, which added an Executive Lounge that all arriving and departing passengers can utilize. The lounge is full of comforts and services at Douglas Charles Airport of Dominica. Lounge Seating, Complimentary Wi-Fi, Newspaper/ Magazine, Tourism Information and Bookings, Flight Monitors, Cultural Exhibits, Complimentary beverages, Complimentary snacks, Private Rest Rooms, Personalized Meet and Greets, Baggage Assistance, Assisted Immigration and Customs, and Taxi Arrangements. The lounge has many offerings and 3 categories of arrival and departure services. These include:

An In-Lounge Service:

A La Carte In Lounge services: Reserved Seating/Service area, Conference/Meeting Room, and a Complimentary Local Call.

Arrival Services

Concierge Arrival Services: Personalized Meet & Greet, Baggage Assistance, Taxi Arrangements, and Assisted Immigration & Customs.
A La Carte Arrival Services: Personalized Meet & Greet, Baggage Assistance, Assisted Immigration & Customs, and Taxi Arrangements.

Departure Services

Basic: Lounge Security Screening, Boarding Announcements, Airside Access to the Departure Gate.
Concierge Departure Services: Baggage Assistance, Check-in Assistance, Lounge Security Screening, Boarding Announcements, and Plane Boarding Assistance.
A La Carte Departure Services: Baggage Assistance, Check-in Assistance, and Plane Boarding Assistance.

Passenger gates

With the recent commencement of service to Miami operated by American Airlines, a ground-level Passenger gate system was implemented.

The terminal currently has three ground-level gates.
Airlines and their respective gates are as follows:

Ground-level (Gate 1) - American Eagle.
Ground-level (Gate 2) - Not Assigned (No other airlines utilize the Parking Stand on the apron) - (Gate 2 - Airport terminal) - Air Antilles, Caribbean Airlines, InterCaribbean Airways, LIAT, Silver Airways
All other turboprop airliners are remotely parked at various non-gated areas on the apron.

Runways and taxiways
The airport features one 5,761-foot runway. Runway 09 has a 1,158 foot Displaced Threshold due to the rising terrain to the west of the airport, with an available landing distance of 4,603 feet. It's only authorized for visual approaches, and landings at night are prohibited. Runway 27 departures are prohibited.
Runway 09 - Visual Approach - HIRL available
Runway 27 - RNAV Approach - HIRL available - SALS - Has a (PAPI) Precision approach path indicator System at ( angle 3.00°)

Runway extenson
According to unofficial reports, there have been soil testings and land evaluations taking place on the western end of Runway 09/27. According to those reports, there are plans for a Runway 09 extension further into the valley to accommodate larger passenger aircraft.

Airlines and destinations

Passenger

Cargo

Statistics

Top destinations

Visitor arrival performance 2021-2022

As countries emerge out of the Covid-19 pandemic, travel and passenger arrivals have increased. Below are the statistics from Q1 2021 - June 2022.

Visitor arrival overview 2021

 Total Stayover arrivals 2021 - 14,888 - a 31.5% decline over 2020. This performance also reflects an 83% decline over the corresponding pre-COVID period in 2019.
 Total visitor arrivals for the 9-month period (April to December) exceeded the corresponding period in 2020 by 288%.
 Q4 Arrivals (October, November, December) - 6,257. This number accounted for 42% of 2021 stayover arrivals compared to 2020 when Q4 accounted for only 10% of arrivals.
 (December Arrivals) - 3,217 (accounted for the higher number of arrivals per monthly basis.

Visitor arrival overview 2022
Q1 Total Stayover Arrivals

The total stayover arrivals in the month of May was 8,050. (Reflecting a 300% increase over the corresponding period in 2021, and a 29% increase versus Q4 of 2021).
 A Month-on-month improvement was seen in arrivals, with February arrivals increasing 26% over January and March increasing 15% over February. March 2022 visitor arrivals are the second highest since the advent of the pandemic in 2020, falling below December 2021 by 3%. March 2022 exceeded the corresponding period in 2021 by 309%.

May stayover statistics

In May, stayover visitations totaled 4,181, reflective of a 391% increase over the corresponding period in 2021. Notwithstanding the 30% decline over 2019. The USA dominated May arrivals, accounting for 35%.

Y-T-D June 2022 stayover arrivals surpass Full-Year 2021

 Dominica's tourism industry is on a path to recovery; evident in the performance of stayover visitor arrivals in the first half of 2022, which has already surpassed total arrivals in 2021. Data depicts a total of 21,162 arrivals for the period. Despite those numbers falling below the corresponding pre-pandemic period (2019), this performance reflects a 348% increase over the same period in 2021 (4,715) and a 42% increase over the full year of 2021 (14,888). 
 H1 2022 performance exceeded the corresponding period in 2020 by 15% and fell slightly below the full year 2020 (3%).
 April registered the highest number of arrivals for H1 2022 and was also the best performing month since the pandemic struck in 2020.
 The U.S market dominated H1 2022 stayover arrivals, accounting for 35% of the total, which can be attributed to the recently debuted direct flights from the US mainland on American Airlines.
 The recently introduced daily flights from the US mainland, and the introduction of new flights and routes by existing airlines will positively increase the trend in stayover arrivals in the upcoming months.

Dominica’s Visitor Arrivals from the US Continue to Rise

Since the inauguration of American Airlines, there has been a significant increase in U.S Visitor arrivals to the island. A total of 2,019 visitor arrivals were recorded in July 2022, the highest on record (dating back to February 2017, when Ross University operated within Dominica).
 Between January to July 2022, the US market accounted for 33% of total arrivals into Dominica, a 17 percentage point increase over the same period in 2017 when it accounted for 14% of arrivals.

 American Airlines has seen month-on-month increases in passenger arrivals and now accounts for 75% of US visitor arrivals into Dominica. The airline is also the largest air carrier, accounting for 36% of total air arrivals; among nine airline operators.

Carrier shares

Carrier market shares

Annual traffic

Incidents and accidents
An Air Anguilla Cessna 402 impacted terrain west of the airport, killing all 11 on board, on 23 August 1998.
On Saturday 11 August 2007, a Learjet 35 business jet ran off the runway suffering extensive damage.
On Tuesday 4 December 2012, an Amerijet Boeing 727 cargo jet overran the runway, no reported damage or injuries.
On April 8, 2019, a British Aerospace 4100 Jetstream 41, registration HI1038, crash-landed at Douglas Charles Airport, Commonwealth of Dominica, after a commercial flight from Santo Domingo, Dominican Republic. There were no fatalities.

Other facilities
The airport houses the Dominica Outstation of the Eastern Caribbean Civil Aviation Authority.

Navigation
The airport offers an RNAV approach only on Runway 27. Landings on Runway 09 are strictly visual.

See also

Transport in Dominica
List of airports in Dominica

References

External links 
OpenStreetMap - Douglas-Charles International Airport
Melville Hall Airport Expansion Project Continues, 15 Feb 2006

1961 establishments in Dominica
Airports in Dominica
Airports established in 1961